Manasarowar Pushkarini Vidhyasrama PU College is a pre-university college in  Mysore, Karnataka, India. It is affiliated to Karnataka Pre-University Education Board. It is located. It is situated behind Yoganarashima Swamy Temple, Hunsur Road, Vijayanagar 2nd Stage

Streams offered
The college offers courses in the below mentioned science streams
1. PCMB - Physics, Chemistry, Mathematics, Biology
2. PCMC - Physics, Chemistry, Mathematics, Computer Science

Facilities
1.	Well-equipped Laboratories
2.	Full-fledged Library
3.	Playground
4.	Canteen

References

Pre University colleges in Karnataka
Universities and colleges in Mysore